Collaborative finance is a category of financial transaction that occurs directly between individuals without the intermediation of a traditional financial institution. This new way to manage informal financial transactions has been enabled by advances in social media and peer-to-peer online platforms. The wide variety of collaborative finance resources may vary not only in their organizational and operational aspects, but also by geographical region, share of the financial market etc. It is precisely this heterogeneity that enables the informal savings and credit activity to profitably reach those income-groups not served by commercial banks and other financial institutions. It is their informality, adaptability and flexibility of operations – characteristics which reduce their transactions costs and confers upon them their comparative advantage and economic rationale. Collaborative Finance is characterized by highly personalized loan transactions entailing face-to-face dealings with borrowers and flexibility in respect of loan purpose, interest rates, collateral requirements, maturity periods and debt rescheduling.

Following are the features of collaborative finance that make it attractive to low income households:
 It does not require a license – most informal suppliers work without an operating license to supply money.
 It is non-profit motivated – profit, if any, is ploughed back into the community and its members.
 It has multiple proprietorship – proprietorship lies not with one or two persons, but the group as a whole.
 It does not need collateral – collateral and guarantees of repayment is ensured by, for example, peer pressure.
 It has specific borrowers identified – most of whom are members of the community.
 It has close informational links – between members that ensure repayment.
 It facilitates reciprocation of credit disbursal – there is a give-and-take attitude, where borrowers and lenders interchange their roles.
 It is not regulated by the central bank – with respect to limits and restrictions, reporting requirements etc.
 It encourages community participation in other fields of development – the participatory approach of informal initiatives is easily replicable to a wide range of other community development issues.

Origin
The concept has been championed by Don Tapscott and Anthony D. Williams, co-authors of the book MacroWikinomics: rebooting business and the world.

Development

Rotating Saving Associations
A Rotating Savings and Credit Association (ROSCA) is a group of individuals who agree to meet for a defined period of time in order to save and borrow together. "ROSCAs are the poor man's bank, where money is not idle for long but changes hands rapidly, satisfying both consumption and production needs."

ROSCAs are essentially a group of individuals who come together and make regular cyclical contributions to a common fund, which is then given as a lump sum to one member in each cycle. For example, a group of 12 persons may contribute US$35 per month for 12 months. The US$420 collected each month is given to one member. Thus, a member will 'lend' money to other members through his regular monthly contributions. After having received the lump sum amount when it is his turn (i.e. 'borrow' from the group), he then pays back the amount in regular/further monthly contributions. This explains the name rotating savings and credit associations' for such groups. Depending on the cycle in which a member receives his/her lump sum, members alternate between being lenders and borrowers. That is, there is a mutual give-and-take involved in ROSCAs.

There is also a growing interest in peer-to-peer lending and neighbourhood service systems: rather than consumers renting services from businesses, platforms are emerging to facilitate shared usage with each other.

Collaborative lifestyles
This system is based on the sharing and exchange of resources and assets such as space, skills, time and money. Such a system, while on-trend and sensible, will further dampen demand for and purchase of new products making economic growth very difficult.

Category examples
 Local currency
 Peer-to-peer lending
 Complementary currency
 Microfinance
 Electronic money
 Collaborative consumption
 Rotating Savings and Credit Association
 Time banks
 LETS
 Virtual currency
 Mutual credit
 Global Resource Bank

See also

 Peer-to-peer (meme)
 Reputation capital
 Reputation systems
 Sharing economy
 Social collaboration
 Social commerce

References

 
Collaboration

Social networks